The 2023 Hamilton Tiger-Cats season is scheduled to be the 65th season for the team in the Canadian Football League and their 73rd overall. The Tiger-Cats will attempt to qualify for the playoffs for the fifth consecutive year and win their ninth Grey Cup championship in a year that the club is scheduled to host the 110th Grey Cup. The 2023 CFL season is scheduled to be the fourth season under head coach Orlondo Steinauer and the second with Steinauer leading the personnel department as the president of football operations.

Offseason

CFL Global Draft
The 2023 CFL Global Draft is scheduled to take place on May 2, 2023. If the same format as the 2022 CFL Global Draft is used, the Tiger-Cats will have three selections in the draft with the fourth-best odds to win the weighted draft lottery.

CFL National Draft
The 2023 CFL Draft is scheduled to take place on May 2, 2023. The Tiger-Cats currently have six selections in the eight-round draft after trading away their second-round, third-round, sixth-round, and seventh-round picks but acquired additional fourth-round and eighth-round picks. The team also exchanged first-round selections with the Calgary Stampeders in the trade for Bo Levi Mitchell. The team is scheduled to have the fourth selection in each round of the draft after finishing fourth-last in the 2022 league standings, not including traded picks.

Preseason

Schedule

Regular season

Season Standings

Season Schedule

Team

Roster

Coaching staff

References

External links
 

Hamilton Tiger-Cats seasons
2023 in Ontario
2023 Canadian Football League season by team